The 1995–96 Montreal Canadiens season was the club's 87th season. This season was notable for the trade of star goaltender Patrick Roy, as well as being their final season in the Montreal Forum before moving to the new Molson Centre.  The club qualified for the playoffs, but lost in the first round to the New York Rangers.

Offseason

Regular season
 At the beginning of the season, captain Mike Keane was subject to media scrutiny after speaking with Mathias Brunet of La Presse (a French language newspaper). Keane said he didn't know how to speak French; but the journalist misunderstood him, and reported him as refusing to learn how to speak French.
 October 17, 1995: Canadiens president Ronald Corey fired general manager Serge Savard and his assistants Andre Boudrias and Carol Vadnais. Head coach Jacques Demers was also relieved of his duties, while assistant coach Charles Thiffault was reassigned. This comes after the Habs surrendered 20 goals in the first 4 games of the season.
 October 21, 1995: Corey hired Rejean Houle to become the Canadiens' new general manager. Mario Tremblay was hired as the new head coach, and Yvan Cournoyer was hired as an assistant coach. Tremblay had been goaltender Patrick Roy's roommate during his rookie season. On that same day, they beat their chief rival the Toronto Maple Leafs 4-3 in their last appearance at the Forum.
 In his first 15 starts with Tremblay as head coach, Roy had 12 wins, 2 losses and 1 tie. The one tie came against the Colorado Avalanche. Despite this hot start, Roy and Tremblay clashed multiple times.  While in Edmonton, Tremblay spotted Roy in the hotel bar and told him that he wanted him to leave. A conflict ensued in Montreal when Tremblay told Roy that he was not allowed to visit the trainer's room and speak to teammates unless he was injured.
 November 28, 1995: The day before the a game against the Detroit Red Wings, Mario Tremblay spoke to Mario Leclerc of Le Journal de Montreal. Tremblay mentioned that he was resentful of current Red Wings head coach Scotty Bowman. The first five years of Tremblay's career were played under Bowman, and Tremblay told Leclerc that Bowman always threatened to send him to the minors. When Leclerc approached Cournoyer, he stated that he did not want to speak about Bowman. The Canadiens lost the game by a score of 3–2. The next day, the Journal de Montreal had a headline that stated "Bowman has the last word".
 February 5, 1996: Patrick Roy played the Canadiens for the first time since he was traded to the Colorado Avalanche. Roy stopped 37 of 39 shots in a 4–2 win. After the game, Roy took the game puck and flipped it to Mario Tremblay.

Patrick Roy's final game
 On December 2, 1995, head coach Mario Tremblay kept goaltender Patrick Roy in goal as he conceded 9 goals on 26 shots during an 11–1 loss to Scotty Bowman's Detroit Red Wings. This was the last straw for Roy in what was already a contentious relationship with the rookie head coach. Friction between the two dated back to Roy's rookie year, when Tremblay used to needle the young Quebecer on his broken English and was critical of Roy through much of his career. The two had almost come to blows in a Long Island coffee shop before Tremblay was announced as a coach, and Tremblay's first appearance in the dressing room was greeted with snickers from Roy. They almost fought a second time after Tremblay fired a shot at Roy's throat during practice.
 After Roy was replaced midway through the second period, he went over to Canadiens president Ronald Corey and stated that he had played his final game with the Canadiens.  He later elaborated by saying that he would not play for Montreal as long as Tremblay was coach.

Le Trade
 On December 6, four days after the incident, Roy was traded to Colorado (along with team captain Mike Keane) in exchange for Jocelyn Thibault, Martin Rucinsky and Andrei Kovalenko, a deal known in Montreal as "Le Trade". Roy's relationship with the Canadiens remained strained until 2008, when it was announced that his #33 jersey would be retired. The trade benefited Colorado, as Roy helped the Avalanche win the 1996 Stanley Cup Finals.

Final game at the Forum
 On March 11, 1996, the Canadiens played their last game at the Montreal Forum, defeating the Dallas Stars 4–1 on a Monday night. The game was televised on TSN and TQS in Canada, and on ESPN in the United States. After the game, many previous hockey greats were presented to the crowd. The largest ovation of the night was left at the end for legendary Canadiens star Maurice "Rocket" Richard, at over 16 minutes in length.

Season standings

Schedule and results

Playoffs

Player statistics

Regular season
Scoring

Goaltending

Playoffs
Scoring

Goaltending

Awards and records

Transactions

Draft picks

See also
 1995–96 NHL season

References
 Canadiens on Hockey Database
 Canadiens on NHL Reference

Montreal Canadiens seasons
Montreal Canadiens season, 1995-96
Montreal
Montreal Canadiens
Montreal Canadiens